The 1988–89 Copa México is the 61st staging of the Copa México, the 34th staging in the professional era.

The competition started on September 8, 1988, and concluded on January 25, 1989 with the final, in which Toluca lifted the trophy for the second time ever with a 3–2 victory over U. de G.

This edition was played by 20 teams, first with a group stage and later a knock-out stage.

Group stage
Group A

Results

Group B

Results

Group C

Results

Group D

Results

Final stage

Semifinals

First leg

Second leg

Toluca advanced to final aggregate 4-3

U. de G. advanced to final aggregate 3-1

Final

First leg

Second leg

The match was suspended at 111' due to U de G only 6 players left, result stood
Toluca Won the cup aggregate 3-2

References
Mexico - Statistics of Copa México for the 1988–89 season. (RSSSF)

Copa MX
Cop
1988–89 domestic association football leagues